The Tapeinos horos is a traditional Greek dance.

The word tapeinos in Greek means "humble", and horos is the Greek word for dance. In many villages in Thrace, this dance is done with slow, humble steps. It is a woman's dance, with simple and slow steps. It is the first dance done after the wedding ceremony, led by the bride.

See also
Greek music 
Greek dances
Tsamiko
Hasapiko or makellarios 
Pentozali 
Sousta
Greek folk music

References

Greek dances
Thrace